Ljubomir Stevanović (born 8 August 1986) is a Serbian professional footballer who plays as an attacking midfielder for OFK Kikinda.

Club career
In his homeland, Stevanović played for Mladost Apatin, Proleter Zrenjanin, Vojvodina and Banat Zrenjanin. He was transferred to Macedonian club Metalurg Skopje in the summer of 2011. Stevanović spent the following three seasons with the club, making over 100 competitive appearances.

In June 2014, Stevanović signed a one-year contract with Kalloni.

On 26 August 2015 he signed a contract with Trikala.

On 14 July 2021, he signed with OFK Kikinda.

International career
Stevanović represented Serbia and Montenegro at the 2005 UEFA European Under-19 Championship. He made one appearance for the Serbian national under-21 team, coming on as a substitute in a friendly game against Portugal U21 on 14 November 2006.

References

External links
 
 
 Ljubomir Stevanović at Footballdatabase

1986 births
Living people
Serbia and Montenegro footballers
Serbian footballers
Serbian expatriate footballers
Association football midfielders
Sportspeople from Zrenjanin
Serbia under-21 international footballers
FK Banat Zrenjanin players
FK Metalurg Skopje players
FK Mladost Apatin players
FK Proleter Zrenjanin players
FK Vojvodina players
Trikala F.C. players
Aris Thessaloniki F.C. players
Doxa Drama F.C. players
FK Rabotnički players
Olympiacos Volos F.C. players
FK Železničar Pančevo players
OFK Kikinda players
Macedonian First Football League players
Serbian SuperLiga players
Super League Greece players
Football League (Greece) players
Serbian First League players
Serbian expatriate sportspeople in Greece
Serbian expatriate sportspeople in North Macedonia
Expatriate footballers in Greece
Expatriate footballers in North Macedonia